Michael J. Tully Jr. (July 23, 1933 – August 5, 1997) was an American lawyer and politician from New York.

Life
Michael Tully was born on July 23, 1933, in New York City, the son of two Irish immigrants. He graduated from St. John's University and St. John's University School of Law. He practiced law in Roslyn, and entered politics as a Republican.

He was an Assistant D.A. of Nassau County; a member of the Town Council of North Hempstead from 1968 to 1971; and Supervisor of the Town of North Hempstead from 1972 to 1982.

On April 20, 1982, he was elected to the New York State Senate (7th D.), to fill the vacancy caused by the death of John D. Caemmerer. He was re-elected several times, and remained in the State Senate until his death in 1997, sitting in the 184th, 185th, 186th, 187th, 188th, 189th, 190th, 191st and 192nd New York State Legislatures. He was Chairman of the Committee on Health from 1989 to 1994.

Death and legacy 
Tully died on August 5, 1997 of an unexpected heart attack at his home in Flower Hill, New York.  He was survived by his wife, Mary, and four adult children. Michael J. Tully Park, an outdoor sports complex and indoor aquatic activities center located in New Hyde Park, is named after him.

See also 

 Elaine Phillips – Another New York State Senator from Flower Hill.

References

1933 births
1997 deaths
People from North Hempstead, New York
Republican Party New York (state) state senators
St. John's University School of Law alumni
Town supervisors in New York (state)
20th-century American politicians
Flower Hill, New York